Sir Nicholas Robert Hytner (born 7 May 1956) is an English theatre director, film director, and film producer. He was previously the Artistic Director of London's National Theatre. His major successes as director include Miss Saigon, The History Boys and One Man, Two Guvnors. He has also known for directing films such as The Madness of King George (1994), The Crucible (1996), The History Boys (2006), and The Lady in the Van (2015). Hytner was knighted in the 2010 New Year Honours for services to drama by Queen Elizabeth II.

Early life and education
Hytner was born in the prosperous suburbs of south Manchester in 1956, to barrister Benet Hytner and his wife, Joyce. He is the eldest child of four, and has described his upbringing as being in "a typical Jewish, cultured family".

He attended Manchester Grammar School and went to university at Trinity Hall, Cambridge, where he studied English. He did some acting whilst at university, including co-scripting and performing in a televised production of the 1977 Cambridge Footlights Revue. However, Hytner did not consider acting his strong point. "I think I was savvy enough when I went to Cambridge to discover I was a poor actor," he said later. He also did some directing, including a production of Bertolt Brecht and Kurt Weill's Rise and Fall of the City of Mahagonny.

Career

Early career
After leaving Cambridge, Hytner's first "proper paid job" was as assistant to Colin Graham at English National Opera. Some of his earliest professional directing work was in opera, including at Kent Opera, Wexford Festival Opera and a production of Rienzi at English National Opera. His first theatre productions were at the Northcott Theatre, Exeter. He then directed a series of productions at the Leeds Playhouse, including  The Ruling Class by Peter Barnes, an adaptation of Tom Jones and a musical version of Alice in Wonderland. In 1985 he became an Associate Director of the Royal Exchange Theatre, Manchester, a position he retained until 1989.

Theatre director
Hytner was hired by producer Cameron Mackintosh to direct Miss Saigon, the next work from Les Misérables creators Alain Boublil and Claude-Michel Schönberg. "I had seen several of Nick's opera productions – Handel's 'Xerxes' and Mozart's 'Magic Flute' – as well as some of his classical plays, and he has a marvellously visual point of view," Mackintosh said. For Hytner, "It just felt like a huge lark... It was gigantic, and I was into gigantic at the time, so I threw everything I knew at it. It was big, honest, moving, brash, kind of crazy. I had no idea that it would take off."

Hytner's London production of Miss Saigon opened on 20 September 1989, and closed on 30 October 1999 after just over ten years, on its 4,274th performance, having grossed more than £150 million in ticket sales during its London run. Hytner also directed the New York production, where the show recouped its $10.9m investment in 39 weeks. The show, at New York's Broadway Theatre, opened on 11 April 1991 and closed on 28 January 2001 after 4,092 performances.

Hytner was on a percentage for both London and New York productions, allowing him (then aged 34) to never need worry about money again. "It was a huge– a massive stroke of fortune," he said in 2010. "It meant that thereafter I only needed to do what I wanted to do."

What Hytner did was to continue directing theatre and opera, including several productions at London's National Theatre (where he had first directed in 1989 with Ghetto). In 1990, he was appointed an Associate Director of the National by its then-Director Richard Eyre. One of the plays he directed was Alan Bennett's The Madness of George III. When a film adaptation was commissioned, Bennett insisted Hytner should direct it, and the retitled The Madness of King George (1994) became Hytner's film debut.

In 1994, Eyre announced he would be leaving the National Theatre in three years' time. "[It] made me begin to think about the vision that is needed in such a position and the fact that this needs refreshing under every directorate. I very much felt that you had to have a big idea in order to put yourself forward for such a role and as I didn't have this kind of idea at that time, I decided not to apply," Hytner said later. He continued as an Associate Director at the National until 1997, when the new Director, Trevor Nunn, took up his post.

Hytner directed more films: The Crucible (1996) with Daniel Day-Lewis, The Object of My Affection (1998) and Center Stage (2000). The last of these was not an adaptation from a play or novel, having been based on an original screenplay. He also spent 15 months developing a film of the musical Chicago, to star Madonna, but the project foundered and was later made with a different director and cast.

National Theatre Director
When Trevor Nunn announced that he would be leaving the National Theatre, Hytner "really felt that this time I had a strong sense of what the NT should be doing under a new Director. I had a long conversation with Christopher Hogg, then Chairman of the NT Board, and Tom Stoppard about my ideas for the NT's future. These included a redefinition of how it might be possible to use the theatre spaces and opening up the NT to new audiences by lowering prices for some performances." Hytner was successful in his application for the post, and his appointment as Director was announced in September 2001. He took over from Nunn in April 2003.

Hytner's role as Director of the National involves decisions about what plays are staged. "Essentially what I do is produce 20 shows a year here," he stated in one interview. "To produce as opposed to direct, as I generate the ideas, generate the repertoire. What I do is put together the team that are going to stage the repertoire together then stand back and come in at a later stage to see how it's all going." (Hytner does also direct plays himself at the National, and all his theatre work since 2003 has originated there.) But his role is also about the overall direction of the National Theatre as an organisation. "It would be wrong to say that I confine myself only to the repertoire – I don't. I think how we allocate our resources, exactly what we spend money on, is always an artistic decision. I think the amount of attention we give to what goes on in the foyers, what goes on outside, how the building looks at night, the amount of attention we give to our education work and our website are all artistic matters. They all stem from a sense of the artistic direction of the organization."

Under Hytner's directorship, the National has innovated with Sunday openings, live cinema broadcasts of NT plays around the world, National Theatre Live, and with its reduced price ticket seasons. These seasons, sponsored by Travelex, have offered large numbers of reduced price seats (for £10 when the scheme was introduced in 2003, with prices rising to £12 from 2011). The reduced price seasons were credited with achieving high usage for the Olivier auditorium – between 90% and 100% full during the summer months compared to a historic average of 65%, with no loss in overall income, and with encouraging a younger and more diverse audience. In 2003 it was reported that one third of the audience for the multiracial production of Henry V in modern dress (directed by Hytner) had never been to the theatre before, and that a large section of the audience for the drama Elmina's Kitchen were black east Londoners new to the National.

Hytner has said that this diversity is a consequence of the theatre's direction rather than the motivation for it. "I think our repertoire is more diverse than it's ever been," he said, "and I think that reflects a more diverse society and a more diverse audience. The aim, though, was not to go out and find a diverse audience but for the repertoire to reflect a greater diversity in our culture." He has also said: "The rep[ertoire] should reflect the world we're part of, and it should put the society in which we live in the context of the past and, as far as we can, of the wider world."

Hytner's latest innovation is NT Future, a £70 million scheme (of which £59 million had been raised at October 2012) to open up the National's building and to contribute to the regeneration of the South Bank, to transform facilities for education and participation, and to keep ahead of new technologies and the changing needs of theatre artists and audiences.

Hytner stated as early as 2010 that he did not wish to stay as head of the National indefinitely, saying, "I've been here seven years. My predecessors have averaged 12. It's important that someone else comes in and shakes it up again so I won't be here in 10 years, that's for sure." In April 2013, he announced that he would step down as Director of the National Theatre at the end of March 2015. In his role as Director of National Theatre, he appeared on the Cultural Exchange as part of the Radio Four programme Front Row, where he chose The Marriage of Figaro by Mozart as his work of art.

Opera and film
Hytner has worked extensively in opera, with many of his productions achieving critical acclaim and commercial success – his English National Opera staging of The Magic Flute was in repertory for 25 years. But Hytner has described himself (to an opera-related audience) as "someone who is unimpressed by his own work on the operatic stage".

Similarly, most of Hytner's films have achieved critical and commercial success, with The Madness of King George winning BAFTA and Evening Standard awards for best British film, but he still sees himself as primarily a theatre practitioner. "I think I'm a theatre director who does other stuff," he has said. "I can't see myself as a film-maker. I love doing opera when ever I've done it, but I always see myself as visiting from the theatre, which is where I belong. The real film-maker thinks with a camera, which is something I just can't do."

Personal life
Hytner is gay. Although brought up in a Jewish household, Hytner said in 2010, "I'm not a believer, but I do think it is a significant part of my adventure and it fascinates me. I couldn't say I'm a member of the Jewish community or gay community in that I don't seek out either of those communities to hang out with, but it is an important part of who I believe myself to [be]."

Hytner's mother, Joyce Hytner OBE, is a theatrical fundraiser, who has served on the board of many organisations including The Old Vic, the Criterion Theatre, the Royal Court Theatre and Historic Royal Palaces.

Filmography

Film 
As a Director

Theatre

Opera

Awards and honours
Hytner is on the Board of Trustees of the Royal Opera House. He is a patron of many organisations including London International Festival of Theatre, HighTide Festival Theatre, the Shakespeare Schools Festival, Dance UK, Action for Children's Arts, Pan Intercultural Arts and Prisoners' Penfriends.

He was elected an Honorary Fellow of Trinity Hall, Cambridge, in 2005, and was Visiting Professor of Contemporary Theatre at Oxford University in 2000–01.

Hytner was knighted in the 2010 New Year Honours for services to drama. In Spring 2014, the Royal Northern College of Music announced it was to confer Honorary Membership of the College upon Hytner. In 2014 he was awarded an Honorary Fellowship of the Royal Academy of Arts.

References

External links
 
 
 

1956 births
Alumni of Trinity Hall, Cambridge
English Jews
English film directors
English theatre directors
English theatre managers and producers
Fellows of St Catherine's College, Oxford
Knights Bachelor
LGBT film directors
LGBT theatre directors
LGBT Jews
English LGBT people
Living people
People educated at Manchester Grammar School
People from Didsbury
Tony Award winners
Fellows of King's College London